The Mountain (2012) is a novel by Australian author Drusilla Modjeska. It was shortlisted for the 2013 Miles Franklin Award.

Plot summary

The novel consists of two parts: "Book One" which features a group of ex-pat Australians and Papuans on a PNG university campus in the period shortly before independence; and "Book Two", set after PNG independence and follows one character's journey back to Australia.

Reviews

Lloyd Jones in The Guardian noted that the novel is "a big and ambitious novel charting new territory in Australian contemporary fiction. There is much to admire."  
Eleanor Limprecht in the Sydney Morning Herald found the novel "is a complex, multi-layered novel, so that the central story is viewed through different angles, in different lights, and comes to mean many different things.

Awards and nominations

 2013 shortlisted Indie Awards — Fiction 
 2013 longlisted ALS Gold Medal 
 2013 shortlisted Miles Franklin Literary Award 
 2013 shortlisted Australian Book Industry Awards (ABIA) — Australian Literary Fiction Book of the Year  
 2014 shortlisted Barbara Jefferis Award

References

2012 Australian novels
Vintage Books books
Novels set in Papua New Guinea
Novels set in Australia